Transfiguration of Vincent, released in 2003, is the third studio album by singer-songwriter M. Ward. The title alludes to the 1965 album The Transfiguration of Blind Joe Death by John Fahey, and refers to the life and death of Vincent O'Brien, a close friend to Ward.

Reception

Transfiguration of Vincent placed on Slant Magazines list of best albums of the 2000s at number 88.

Track listing
 "Transfiguration #1" – 2:41
 "Vincent O'Brien" – 2:38
 "Sad, Sad Song" – 3:10
 "Undertaker" – 3:33
 "Duet for Guitars #3" – 1:52
 "Outta My Head" – 2:52
 "Involuntary" – 4:03
 "Helicopter" – 3:51
 "Poor Boy, Minor Key" – 3:28
 "Fool Says" – 1:49
 "Get to the Table on Time" – 1:30
 "A Voice at the End of the Line" – 2:14
 "Dead Man" – 3:23
 "Let's Dance" (David Bowie) – 5:00
 "Transfiguration #2" – 2:05

References

2003 albums
M. Ward albums